Wenfeng District is a district in Anyang, Henan province, China.

Administrative divisions
As of 2021, this district is divided to 12 subdistricts, 1 town and 1 township.
Subdistricts

Towns
Baoliansi Town
Townships
Gaozhuang Township

Notable events
2022 Anyang factory fire (in Baoliansi Town, Wenfeng District, Anyang).

References

County-level divisions of Henan